Margaret “Peggy” Amy Michell (née Saunders; 28 January 1905 – 19 June 1941) was a British female tennis player active in the 1920s. She is also known under her married name, Peggy Saunders-Michell.

She was educated at St Paul's Girls' School in London.

Along with Phoebe Holcroft, she won two consecutive women's doubles titles at Wimbledon (1928 and 1929) and the US Women's National Championship in 1929. With the same partner, she reached the final at the French Championships in 1927 in which they were defeated by Irene Bowder Peacock and Bobbie Heine.

Her best singles results at a Grand Slam tournament came in 1929 when she reached the fourth round at Wimbledon and the quarterfinals at the U.S. Championships where she lost to Elsie Goldsack and Helen Wills respectively. Michell competed in nine Wimbledon editions between 1925 and 1938.

She won the singles title at the British Covered Court Championships, played on wood courts at the Queen's Club in London, in 1926 and 1929. Ath the same event she also won the doubles title from 1929 to 1933, with four different partners, and the mixed doubles in 1928 and 1928.

Michell was part of the British Wightman Cup team in 1928, 1929 and 1932 and won the cup against the United States in 1928.

Grand Slam finals

Doubles (3 titles, 1 runner-up)

References

External links
 National Portrait Gallery images

1905 births
1941 deaths
English female tennis players
People from Chiswick
United States National champions (tennis)
Grand Slam (tennis) champions in women's doubles
British female tennis players
Tennis people from Greater London